Berlin is the seventh album by Art Zoyd, released in 1987 through Cryonic Inc. Like Le mariage du ciel et de l'enfer before it, Berlin was made available in an expanded form on compact disc.

Track listing

Vinyl pressing

CD pressing

Personnel 
Art Zoyd
Patricia Dallio – piano, electric piano, keyboards
Gérard Hourbette – viola, violin, piano, electric piano, keyboards, percussion
André Mergenthaler – cello, alto saxophone, vocals
Thierry Zaboitzeff – cello, bass guitar, vocals, tape, keyboards, percussion
Production and additional personnel
Art Zoyd – production
Patrice Masson – photography
Platel – illustrations
Unsafe Graphics – design

References

External links 
 

1987 albums
Art Zoyd albums